The 1993 Pittsburgh Steelers season was the franchise's 61st season as a professional sports franchise and as a member of the National Football League. 
 
The Steelers looked to continue the progress made under second year head coach Bill Cowher. However, the team would take a slight step backwards, finishing 9–7 (three games behind the eventual AFC Central champion Houston Oilers). Despite that, the Steelers clinched the final wild card spot, making the playoffs for the second consecutive year. The team would lose to the Kansas City Chiefs 27–24 in overtime in the AFC Wild Card Round of the playoffs, in what is considered one of the best playoff games in NFL history even though the Steelers were on the losing end.

In the second week of the season, the Steelers suffered a rare shutout loss to the Los Angeles Rams 27–0, in one of the team's last visits to the Los Angeles area in the foreseeable future. The day was highlighted by the emergence of Rams rookie Jerome Bettis running over the Steelers defense. Though no one knew it at the time, it would foreshadow what was to come with Bettis' career—as a member of the Steelers, who would acquire Bettis in a draft day trade with the Rams three years later.

1993 was also the season in which the Steelers began their policy of "blacking out" regular season contract negotiations. Early in the season the Steelers had reached contract extensions with Rod Woodson and Barry Foster and continued negotiations with other players.  However, this led to discord in the locker room, and management felt that contract talk was taking the team's focus off of winning.  At mid-season the Steelers broke off all contract negotiations, and have refused to negotiate contracts during the regular season since.

Offseason

NFL draft

Staff

Notable additions include Chad Brown, Kevin Greene and Willie Williams

Roster

Preseason

Schedule

Regular season

Schedule

Standings

Game summaries

Week 1 (Sunday September 5, 1993): vs. San Francisco 49ers 

at Three Rivers Stadium, Pittsburgh, Pennsylvania

 Game time: 1:00 pm EDT
 Game weather: 74 °F (Mostly Sunny)
 Game attendance: 57,502
 Referee: Gordon McCarter
 TV announcers: (CBS) Dick Stockton (play by play), Dan Fouts (color commentator)

Scoring drives:

 San Francisco – FG Cofer 37
 San Francisco – Rice 5 pass from Young (Cofer kick)
 San Francisco – Rice 6 pass from Young (Cofer kick)
 Pittsburgh – FG Anderson 29
 Pittsburgh – Foster 5 run (Anderson kick)
 Pittsburgh – FG Anderson 39
 San Francisco – B. Jones 5 pass from Young (Cofer kick)

Week 2 (Sunday September 12, 1993): at Los Angeles Rams  

at Anaheim Stadium, Anaheim, California

 Game time: 4:00 pm EDT
 Game weather: 72 °F (Cloudy)
 Game attendance: 50,588
 Referee: Dick Hantak
 TV announcers: (NBC) Dan Hicks (play by play), Joe Gibbs (color commentator)

Scoring drives:

 Los Angeles Rams – Drayton 22 pass from Everett (Zendejas kick)
 Los Angeles Rams – Gary 6 run (Zendejas kick)
 Los Angeles Rams – FG Zendejas 54
 Los Angeles Rams – FG Zendejas 50
 Los Angeles Rams – Bettis 29 run (Zendejas kick)

Week 3 (Sunday September 19, 1993): vs. Cincinnati Bengals  

at Three Rivers Stadium, Pittsburgh, Pennsylvania

 Game time: 1:00 pm EDT
 Game weather: 66 °F (Mostly Sunny)
 Game attendance: 53,682
 Referee: Gerald Austin
 TV announcers: (NBC) Tom Hammond (play by play), Cris Collinsworth (color commentator)

Scoring drives:

 PIttsburgh – Mills 3 pass from O'Donnell (Anderson kick)
 Pittsburgh – FG Anderson 33
 Cincinnati – Pickens 15 pass from Klingler (Pelfrey kick)
 Pittsburgh – Thigpen 18 pass from O'Donnell (Anderson kick)
 Pittsburgh – FG Anderson 34
 Pittsburgh – Stone 9 pass from O'Donnell (Anderson kick)
 PIttsburgh – Stone 38 run (Anderson kick)

Week 4 (Monday September 27, 1993): at Atlanta Falcons  

at Georgia Dome, Atlanta

 Game time: 9:00 pm EDT
 Game weather: Dome
 Game attendance: 65,477
 Referee: Bob McElwee
 TV announcers: (ABC) Al Michaels (play by play), Frank Gifford & Dan Dierdorf (color commentators)

Scoring drives:

 Pittsburgh – Foster 30 run (Anderson kick)
 Atlanta – T. Smith 97 kickoff return (N. Johnson kick)
 Atlanta – Clark 46 fumble return (N. Johnson kick)
 Pittsburgh – FG Anderson 21
 Atlanta – FG N. Johnson 49
 Pittsburgh – Foster 7 run (Anderson kick)
 Pittsburgh – Stone 4 pass from O'Donnell (Anderson kick)
 Pittsburgh – Thigpen 7 pass from O'Donnell (Anderson kick)
 Pittsburgh – Foster 1 run (Anderson kick)
 Pittsburgh – Davidson 18 fumble return (Anderson kick)

Week 5 (Sunday October 3, 1993): Bye Week

Week 6 (Sunday October 10, 1993): vs. San Diego Chargers  

at Three Rivers Stadium, Pittsburgh, Pennsylvania

 Game time: 4:00 pm EDT
 Game weather: 47 °F (Partly Sunny)
 Game attendance: 55,264
 Referee: Gary Lane
 TV announcers: (NBC) Dan Hicks (play by play), Dan Hampton (color commentator)

Scoring drives:

 Pittsburgh – FG Anderson 37
 Pittsburgh – FG Anderson 34
 San Diego – FG Carney 33
 Pittsburgh – Kirkland 16 fumble return (Anderson kick)
 Pittsburgh – FG Anderson 35

Week 7 (Sunday October 17, 1993): vs. New Orleans Saints  

at Three Rivers Stadium, Pittsburgh, Pennsylvania

 Game time: 1:00 pm EDT
 Game weather: 65 °F (Light Rain)
 Game attendance: 56,056
 Referee: Howard Roe
 TV announcers: (CBS) Tim Ryan (play by play), Matt Millen (color commentator)

Scoring drives:

 Pittsburgh – Woodson 63 interception return (Anderson kick)
 Pittsburgh – Foster 20 pass from O'Donnell (Anderson kick)
 Pittsburgh – FG Anderson 40
 Pittsburgh – Foster 1 run (Anderson kick)
 Pittsburgh – FG Anderson 22
 Pittsburgh – FG Anderson 29
 Pittsburgh – Green 26 pass from Tomczak (Anderson kick)
 New Orleans – Small 3 pass from Buck (Anderson kick)
 New Orleans – Early 63 pass from Buck (Anderson kick)

Week 8 (Sunday October 24, 1993): at Cleveland Browns  

at Cleveland Municipal Stadium, Cleveland, Ohio

 Game time: 4:00 pm EDT
 Game weather:
 Game attendance: 78,118
 Referee: Tom White
 TV announcers: (NBC) Tom Hammond (play by play), Cris Collinsworth (color commentator)

Scoring drives:

 Cleveland – Jackson 62 pass from Testaverde (Stover kick)
 Cleveland – Metcalf 91 punt return (Stover kick)
 Pittsburgh – Foster 4 run (Anderson kick)
 Pittsburgh – Foster 1 run (Anderson kick)
 Pittsburgh – FG Anderson 30
 Cleveland – Wolfey 4 pass from Testaverde (Stover kick)
 Pittsburgh – FG Anderson 46
 Pittsburgh – FG Anderson 30
 Cleveland – Metcalf 75 punt return (Stover kick)

Week 9 (Sunday October 31, 1993): Bye Week

Week 10 (Sunday November 7, 1993): at Cincinnati Bengals  

at Riverfront Stadium, Cincinnati

 Game time: 1:00 pm EST
 Game weather:
 Game attendance: 51,202
 Referee: Johnny Grier
 TV announcers: (NBC) Drew Goodman (play by play), Dan Hampton (color commentator)

Scoring drives:

 Cincinnati – FG Pelfrey 32
 Cincinnati – Williams 97 interception return (kick failed)
 Cincinnati – Query 7 pass from Schroeder (Pelfrey kick)
 Pittsburgh – Green 71 pass from O'Donnell (Anderson kick)
 Pittsburgh – Hoge 9 pass from O'Donnell (Anderson kick)
 Pittsburgh – Foster 1 run (Anderson kick)
 Pittsburgh – FG Anderson 23

Week 11 (Monday November 15, 1993): vs. Buffalo Bills  

at Three Rivers Stadium, Pittsburgh, Pennsylvania

 Game time: 9:00 pm EST
 Game weather: 50 °F (Cloudy)
 Game attendance: 60,265
 Referee: Ed Hochuli
 TV announcers: (ABC)  Al Michaels (play by play), Frank Gifford & Dan Dierdorf (color commentators)

Scoring drives:

 Pittsburgh – Thompson 9 run (Anderson kick)
 Pittsburgh – FG Anderson 37
 Pittsburgh – Green 1 pass from O'Donnell (Anderson kick)
 Pittsburgh – FG Anderson 19
 Pittsburgh – FG Anderson 31

Week 12 (Sunday November 21, 1993): at Denver Broncos  

at Mile High Stadium, Denver, Colorado

 Game time: 4:00 pm EST
 Game weather:
 Game attendance: 74,840
 Referee: Gordon McCarter
 TV announcers: (NBC) Bob Costas (play by play), Joe Gibbs (color commentator)

Scoring drives:

 Denver – FG Elam 48
 Denver – Delpino 1 run (Elam kick)
 Denver – Russell fumble recovery in end zone (Elam kick)
 Denver – FG Elam 27
 Pittsburgh – FG Anderson 37
 Denver – Delpino 1 run (Elam kick)
 Denver – V. Johnson 13 pass from Elway (Elam kick)
 Pittsburgh – FG Anderson 38
 Denver – FG Elam 28
 Pittsburgh – Thigpen 39 pass from Tomczak (Anderson kick)

Week 13 (Sunday November 28, 1993): at Houston Oilers  

at Astrodome, Houston, Texas

 Game time: 8:00 pm EST
 Game weather: Dome
 Game attendance: 61,238
 Referee: Gerald Austin
 TV announcers: (ESPN) Mike Patrick (play by play), Joe Theismann (color commentator)

Scoring drives:

 Houston – FG Del Greco 43
 Pittsburgh – FG Anderson 42
 Houston – Brown 3 run (Del Greco kick)
 Houston – Jeffires 66 pass from Moon (Del Greco kick)
 Houston – FG Del Greco 21
 Houston – FG Del Greco 28

Week 14 (Sunday December 5, 1993): vs. New England Patriots  

at Three Rivers Stadium, Pittsburgh, Pennsylvania

 Game time: 1:00 pm EST
 Game weather: 42 °F (Cloudy)
 Game attendance: 51,358
 Referee: Ron Blum
 TV announcers: (NBC) Don Criqui (play by play), Paul Maguire (color commentator)

Scoring drives:

 New England – Coates 3 pass from Bledsoe (Sisson kick)
 New England – Russell 3 run (Sisson kick)
 Pittsburgh – Hoge 5 pass from O'Donnell (Anderson kick)
 Pittsburgh – FG Anderson 35
 Pittsburgh – Hoge 1 pass from O'Donnell (Anderson kick)

Week 15 (Monday December 13, 1993): at Miami Dolphins  

at Joe Robbie Stadium, Miami, Florida

 Game time: 9:00 pm EST
 Game weather: 68 °F (Partly cloudy)
 Game attendance: 70,232
 Referee: Jerry Markbreit
 TV announcers: (ABC) Al Michaels (play by play), Frank Gifford & Dan Dierdorf (color commentators)

Scoring drives:

 Miami – FG Stoyanovich 22
 Pittsburgh – Thompson 3 run (Anderson kick)
 Pittsburgh – Hoge 2 pass from O'Donnell (Anderson kick)
 Miami – K. Jackson 3 pass from DeBerg (Stoyanovich kick)
 Miami – McDuffie 72 punt return (Stoyanovich kick)

Week 16 (Sunday December 19, 1993): vs. Houston Oilers  

at Three Rivers Stadium, Pittsburgh, Pennsylvania

 Game time: 1:00 pm EST
 Game weather: 37 °F (Cloudy)
 Game attendance: 57,592
 Referee: Bernie Kukar
 TV announcers: (NBC) Tom Hammond (play by play), Cris Collinsworth (color commentator)

Scoring drives:

 Houston – G. Brown 38 pass from Moon (Del Greco kick)
 Houston – Orlando 38 interception return (Del Greco kick)
 Houston – FG Del Greco 34
 Houston – FG Del Greco 22
 Pittsburgh – FG Anderson 26
 Houston – FG Del Greco 33
 Pittsburgh – Green 36 pass from O'Donnell (Anderson kick)
 Houston – FG Del Greco 21
 Pittsburgh – Hoge 5 run (Anderson kick)

Week 17 (Sunday December 26, 1993): at Seattle Seahawks  

at Kingdome, Seattle, Washington

 Game time: 4:00 pm EST
 Game weather: Dome
 Game attendance: 51,814
 Referee: Bob McElwee
 TV announcers: (NBC) Charlie Jones (play by play), Todd Christensen (color commentator)

Scoring drives:

 Seattle – Green 2 pass from Mirer (Kasay kick)
 Seattle – FG Kasay 32
 Pittsburgh – FG Anderson 42
 Seattle – FG Kasay 48
 Pittsburgh – FG Anderson 43
 Seattle – FG Kasay 35

Week 18 (Sunday January 2, 1994): vs. Cleveland Browns  

at Three Rivers Stadium, Pittsburgh, Pennsylvania

 Game time: 1:00 pm EST
 Game weather: 32 °F (Cloudy)
 Game attendance: 49,208
 Referee: Dick Hantak
 TV announcers: (NBC) Marv Albert (play by play), Paul Maguire (color commentator)

Scoring drives:

 Pittsburgh – FG Anderson 36
 Cleveland – FG Stover 36
 Cleveland – FG Stover 47
 Cleveland – FG Stover 44
 Pittsburgh – FG Anderson 38
 Pittsburgh – Green 14 pass from O'Donnell (Anderson kick)
 Pittsburgh – FG Anderson 26

Playoffs

Game summary

AFC Wild Card Playoff (Saturday January 8, 1994): at Kansas City Chiefs  

at Arrowhead Stadium, Kansas City, Missouri

 Game time: 12:30 pm EST
 Game weather: 34 °F (Sunny)
 Game attendance: 75,868
 Referee: Gary Lane
 TV announcers: (ABC) Al Michaels (play by play), Frank Gifford & Dan Dierdorf (color commentators)

Scoring drives:

 Pittsburgh – Cooper 10 pass from O'Donnell (Anderson kick)
 Kansas City – Birden 23 pass from Krieg (Lowery kick)
 Pittsburgh – FG Anderson 30
 Pittsburgh – Mills 26 pass form O'Donnell (Anderson kick)
 Kansas City – FG Lowery 23
 Kansas City – Allen 2 run (Lowery kick)
 Pittsburgh – Green 22 pass from O'Donnell (Anderson kick)
 Kansas City – Barnett 7 pass from Montana (Lowery kick)
 Kansas City – FG Lowery 32

References

External links
 1993 Pittsburgh Steelers season at Pro Football Reference 
 1993 Pittsburgh Steelers season statistics at jt-sw.com

Pittsburgh Steelers seasons
Pittsburgh Steelers
Pitts